Chiloglanis orthodontus is a species of upside-down catfish that occurs in several greatly separated sites in the lower Malagarasi River in Tanzania, and is likely endemic to the basin. This species grows to a length of  SL.

References

Further reading

External links 

orthodontus
Freshwater fish of Africa
Fish of Tanzania
Endemic fauna of Tanzania
Fish described in 2011